Jan Poignant (born 2 November 1941) is a Swedish former sports shooter. He competed in three events at the 1964 Summer Olympics.

References

1941 births
Living people
Swedish male sport shooters
Olympic shooters of Sweden
Shooters at the 1964 Summer Olympics
Sport shooters from Stockholm